Khalifa Bahrouni (born 1 October 1936) is a Tunisian racewalker. He competed in the men's 20 kilometres walk at the 1960 Summer Olympics.

References

External links
 

1936 births
Living people
Athletes (track and field) at the 1960 Summer Olympics
Tunisian male racewalkers
Olympic athletes of Tunisia
Place of birth missing (living people)
20th-century Tunisian people